Lumpenopsis is a genus of marine ray-finned fishes belonging to the family Stichaeidae, the pricklebacks or shannies. These fishes are found in the North Pacific Ocean.

Taxonomy
Lumpenopsis was first proposed as a monospecific genus in 1916 by the Russian zoologist Vladimir Soldatov when he described Lumpenopsis pavlenkoi from Peter the Great Bay on the Sea of Japan, which was its only species and which Soldatov also designated as its type species. The genus is placed in the subfamily Opisthocentrinae within the family Stichaeidae by some authorities, while others treat the subfamily as a valid family the Ophistocentridae.

Etymology
Lumpenopsis means "similar in appearance to Lumpenus, although this genus has some differs by having teeth on the vomer, lower dorsal fin spines and in the gill membranes not being joined to the isthmus.

Species
Lumpenopsis contains the following species:

Characteristics
Lumpenopsis fishes have very elongated, eel-like bodies which are laterally compressed with a long head which has an elongated snout. The large eyes are placed high on the head which has no tentacles or cirrhi. There are thin bands of teeth on the jaws and there are vomerine teeth. There are a large number of spines making up the dorsal fin. The pectoral fins are large, their length being greater than half the length of the head. These fishes have pelvic fins which have a single spine and 3 soft rays. The anal fin has 2 spines at its origin and forked soft rays. The dorsal and anal fins touch the base of the caudal fin. The gill membranes have a wide fusion but do not join with the isthmus.

Distribution
Lumpenopsis pricklebacks are found in the eastern and western parts of the North Pacific Ocean.

References

Opisthocentrinae